The Nordic Historical Review (Revue d'Histoire Nordique in French) is a bilingual French-English history journal founded in 2005 and published biannually by the Presses Universitaires du Mirail. The editors-in-chief are Jean-Marc Olivier, Maurice Carrez, and Jean-François Berdah.

The journal covers the history of Scandinavia and the Baltic states up till the present time. Each volume includes a special thematic dossier, as well as a varia section, documents, debates, general news, and book reviews.

See also
List of history journals

External links
 

European history journals
Multilingual journals
Biannual journals
Publications established in 2005